Atle Norstad (born 22 April 1961) is a Norwegian bobsledder. He was born in Sarpsborg. He competed at the 1992 Winter Olympics in Albertville, in men's two together with Erik Gogstad.

References

External links

1961 births
Living people
People from Sarpsborg
Norwegian male bobsledders
Olympic bobsledders of Norway
Bobsledders at the 1992 Winter Olympics
Sportspeople from Viken (county)